Dachstein Glacier is a glacier located between the towns of Ramsau am Dachstein in the south and Hallstatt and Obertraun in the north, in Austria.  Snow is at the top of the glacier throughout the year. However snow is soft in summer. This mountain is located at the borders of Salzburg, Upper Austria and Styria. The train stops at Schladming and from there is a bus to the village below the Dachstein Mountains.

Skiing 
The Dachstein is a popular ski area that remains snow-covered for much of the year. Descents are between 2,700 m and 2,264 m, it has three drag lifts and one two-seater chairlift (all on the eastern part of the glacier, called Schladminger Gletscher, in the municipality of Obertraun), as well as the cable car from Ramsau to take people up to the glacier.

Gallery

References

External links
Tourist Site
Planai Site

Ski areas in Austria
Glaciers of Austria
Tourist attractions in Styria
Landforms of Styria